Eastside High School is a public school in east Gainesville, Florida, United States. It was opened in 1970 and is managed by the Alachua County School District.  Eastside harbors two magnet programs: the Institute of Culinary Arts and an International Baccalaureate (IB) program.

Administration 
The school has been served by the following principals: 
John Dukes, Mae Islar, Ron Nelson, Robert Schenck, Bill Herschleb, Sandra Hollinger, Michael Thorne, Jeff Charbonnet, Shane Andrew, and Leroy Williams.

Academics

Eastside was ranked by Newsweek as the 4th best high school in the United States in 2005, and 6th in 2006, making it the top-rated public high school in the country two years in a row. In 2010 the school was ranked 17th overall, and again in High School Challenge 2011.

Eastside has hosted an International Baccalaureate program, which focuses on the classical liberal arts and sciences, since 1987.

Awards and competitions 
 In 2006 the boys' basketball team won the 5A State Championship, the first state championship in Eastside basketball history. 
 In 2007, the Eastside team at the Florida State Spanish Conference won the state championship.
 Eastside placed first in le Congrès de la Culture Francaise en Floride (French language competition) 27 times from 1991 to 2018.
 In 2013–2014, Eastside's Florida Student Astronaut Challenge team placed first in Florida at the state competition in Cape Canaveral.

Notable alumni
Gator Hoskins - NFL player
Kenyatta Jones - NFL player
Marvin Pope - CFL player and coach
Craig Silverstein - First employee of Google
Allison Wagner - Swimmer
Andrew H. Warren - prosecutor and politician
Nancy Yi Fan - Author
Jarvis Johnson - YouTuber
Anthony Richardson - Quarterback for the Florida Gators

References

External links 
 Eastside High School homepage
 Florida Comprehensive Assessment Test (FCAT) School Level Report for Eastside High School

Educational institutions established in 1970
Magnet schools in Florida
International Baccalaureate schools in Florida
High schools in Alachua County, Florida
Public high schools in Florida
Education in Gainesville, Florida
1970 establishments in Florida